The Kano Chronicle (Tarikh arbab hadha al-balad al-musamma Kano in Arabic) is an Arabic-language manuscript that lists the rulers of Kano.

Summary
The Kano Chronicle is a list of rulers of Kano stretching back to the 10th century AD. It tells of eleven clans of animists (such as salt extractors, brewers, or smiths) who were warned by their spiritual leader that a stranger would come and cut down their sacred tree and wrest their dominion from them: “If he comes not in your time, assuredly he will come in the time of your children, and will conquer all in this country” (Palmer 1928: III: 98). Indeed, a man named Bagauda arrived soon after, conquered, and became the first king of Kano according to the chronicle (Palmer 1928: III: 97-100).

Authorship
The existing Kano Chronicle was probably written in the 1880s by Malam Barka, a Dan Rimi (high-ranking slave official) who worked for Muhammad Bello, the Sarkin Kano (ruler of Kano) who reigned from 1882–1893.

The chronicle may represent the amalgamation of earlier works. The original copy is still with the descendants of Malam Idris al-Khilawiy in Kano.

Translations
The best-known translation is Sir Richmond Palmer's 1908 English translation. Palmer's 1908 English translation of the Kano Chronicle was derived from a manuscript obtained at Sabon Gari near Katsina, northern Nigeria.

There is also a 1933 translation into Hausa by Rupert M. East, titled Labarun Hausawa da Makwabtansu: Littafi na biyu. Since this translation made use of a different source than Palmer's translation, East's text has some differences from Palmer's text.

Rulers listed

Rulers of Kano listed in the Kano Chronicle and their years of reign:

Related manuscripts
There are a few 19-century Arabic-language manuscript king-lists from Kano similar to the full-length Kano Chronicle, which are:

MS Falke 0704 (Umar Falke Collection in the Melville J. Herskovits Library of Africana, Northwestern University; ends with the reign of Muhammad Alwali, 1781-1807)
MS Jos 47 (University of Ibadan, and from the collection of Sir Richmond Palmer; ends with the reign of Ibrahim Dabo, 1819-1846)
MS Jos 53 (University of Ibadan, and from the collection of Sir Richmond Palmer; ends with the reign of Usman, 1846-1855)
MS Paden 399 (Paden Collection of the Melville J. Herskovits Library of Africana, Northwestern University; ends with the reign of Muhammad Tukur, 1893-1895)

See also
 Amina Sukhera
 List of rulers of Kano
 Kingdom of Kano
 Sultanate of Kano

References

.
. Reprinted 1967 by London: Frank Cass.

Further reading

External links
 Kano Archive

African chronicles
Hausa royalty
Chronicle